Mountain View, New Jersey may refer to the following places in New Jersey:
Mountainview, Mercer County, New Jersey, an unincorporated community in Ewing
Mountain View Park (New Jersey), a park in Middlesex
Mountain View (NJT station), a New Jersey Transit train station in Wayne